The Kamal Ban National Park is a protected region located in the Mansehra District, Khyber Pakhtunkhwa, Pakistan.

History
In January 2022, the provincial administration established Kamal Ban National Park as a national park, as part of its efforts to maintain and protect species and their respective habitats in a variety of ecosystems. This park is situated inside the Kaghan Forest Division and encompasses a total area of 5,456 acres.

References

National parks of Pakistan
Mansehra District
Protected areas of Khyber Pakhtunkhwa
Protected areas established in 2022
Parks in Khyber Pakhtunkhwa
2022 establishments in Pakistan